Charlotte Diamond,  (born July 31, 1945), is a Canadian musician, best known for her children's music.

Biography
Charlotte Diamond was born and raised in Vancouver, British Columbia. She graduated from North Delta Secondary School in 1963, and she graduated from the University of British Columbia with a Bachelor of Secondary Education in 1969, majoring in zoology and French language. She took further studies in French language at Laval University, in Quebec City, Quebec. Diamond taught science, French and music at New Westminster Secondary School for ten years. She has spent most her life in Richmond, British Columbia, but now lives in Sechelt, on British Columbia's Sunshine Coast.

Music career
Diamond has recorded fourteen albums including the Juno Award-winning 10 Carrot Diamond, a double-platinum record. Some of her most popular songs include "Four Hugs a Day", "I Am a Pizza", "Octopus (Slippery Fish)", "Each of Us Is a Flower", and "May There Always Be Sunshine". Diamond is trilingual and has recorded songs in Spanish and French, including "Soy una pizza" and "Qu'il y ait toujours le soleil", and she also performs songs in American Sign Language. Her son Matthew is also a musician, joining her for their 2015 album Diamonds by the Sea, as well as touring with her. Diamond has toured in North America, Central America, and Europe.

Awards and recognition
On June 30, 2016, Diamond was made member of the Member of the Order of Canada by Governor General David Johnston for "her contributions as a children's entertainer who, through music, helps develop creativity and self-expression in youth." 

 1986 – winner, Juno Award, Best Children's Album, 10 Carrot Diamond
 1987 – nominee, Juno Award, Best Children's Album, Diamond in the Rough
 1989 – nominee, Juno Award, Best Children's Album, Diamonds and Dragons
 1989 – nominee, Juno Award, Best Children's Album, Qu'il y ait toujours le soleil
 2001 – nominee, Juno Award, Best Children's Album, Charlotte Diamond's World 
 2003 – nominee, Juno Award, Children's Album of the Year, Nous sommes tous comme les fleurs
 2019 – Special Distinguished Service Award, British Columbia Music Educators' Association

Discography
1985: 10 Carrot Diamond
1986: Diamond in the Rough
1988: Diamonds & Dragons
1988: Qu'il y ait toujours le soleil
1990: The Christmas Gift
1992: My Bear Gruff
1993: Bonjour l'hiver
1994: Soy una Pizza
1995: Sing-Along with Charlotte Diamond and Friends
1996: Diamonds & Daydreams
2000: Charlotte Diamond's World
2001: Nous sommes tous comme les fleurs
2006: Todo el Mundo Come Banana!
2011: 24 Carrot Diamond: The Best of Charlotte Diamond
2015: Diamonds by the Sea

Personal life 
Diamond met her husband Harry in 1971. Harry was a salmon fisherman before he joined Charlotte to work for their company, Hug Bug Music. Diamond has two sons and three grandsons.

References

External links

1945 births
Living people
Canadian children's musicians
Canadian women singers
Juno Award for Children's Album of the Year winners
Members of the Order of Canada
Musicians from British Columbia
People from Richmond, British Columbia
University of British Columbia alumni